is a Japanese actor who has appeared in a number of television series and stage plays. He is affiliated with Seinenza Theater Company. He graduated from Tokai University.

Filmography

TV series

Stage

References

External links
Profile at Seinenza Theater Company 
Dehi blog 
Dehi Twitter 
Dehi Instagram 

21st-century Japanese male actors
1977 births
Living people
Tokai University alumni
Male actors from Yokohama
Japanese male television actors